USS Sproston was the name of two destroyers of the United States Navy. Both ships were named for Lieutenant John G. Sproston, an officer of the US Navy during the American Civil War.

United States Navy ship names